The Sandweaver 16 is an open 16 ft dayboat with Gunter or Bermuda rig. It is based on a Blakeney One Design which in turn was based on an Uffa ACE 18. The hull is simulated clinker and there were 11 built by Goodchild Marine in Great Yarmouth, England.

External links
 Goodchild Marine

Keelboats